The Trunk Line is a railway line in Norway which runs between Oslo and Eidsvoll. The line is owned by Bane NOR.

History
Built by Robert Stephenson, the Trunk Line was opened on 1 September 1854 by the Norwegian Trunk Railway, making it the oldest public railway line in Norway. It connected to steamboats on Lake Mjøsa, allowing steam powered transport to places like Lillehammer,  from Oslo. The name comes from the fact that during the planning, it was the only railway project in Norway considered economically viable, since steamboats were considered cheaper if they could be used. The railway was successful and more railways started to be considered.

The section between Kristiania East and Lillestrøm was rebuilt to double track in 1902, and the line was electrified in two portions, in 1927 and 1953. The Trunk Line was the main line between Oslo and Eidsvoll until 8 October 1998, when the more direct, double-tracked high-speed Gardermoen Line opened, taking most of the passenger traffic. 

Today the old line between Oslo and Lillestrøm is used for freight traffic and for commuter trains serving the suburban stations in outer Oslo, Lørenskog and Skedsmo. In addition overcrowded trains are not allowed through the Romerike Tunnel, and are occasionally diverted to the old line.

Passenger service on the old line past Jessheim is only provided to Dal.

Stations

References

External links

Norwegian National Rail Administration's list of stations between Oslo and Lillestrøm  Note: these trains usually start at Asker on the Drammen Line.
Norwegian National Rail Administration's list of stations between Lillestrøm and Dal  Note these trains usually start at Skøyen, and run on the Gardermo Line between Oslo and Lillestrøm.

 
Railway lines in Oslo
Railway lines in Viken
Railway lines opened in 1854
1854 establishments in Norway
Electric railways in Norway
Private railway lines in Norway